San Mateo Nejapam  is a town and municipality in Oaxaca in south-western Mexico. The municipality covers an area of 28.07 km². 
It is part of the Silacayoapam District in the Mixteca Region.

As of 2005, the municipality had a total population of 1127.

References

External links 
 Página web San Mateo Nejapam

Municipalities of Oaxaca